LandFighter is a European all-terrain vehicle brand, owned by the Dutch LandFighter B.V. LandFighter is currently active within the Netherlands, Belgium, Luxembourg, Spain and Portugal. 
For manufacturing LandFighter B.V. has a partnership with Her Chee Industrial Co Ltd (8937.TWO), a Taiwanese stock-exchange based enterprise. Her Chee Industrial Co Ltd is commonly known for the manufacturing of parts for brands like Can-Am and Arctic Cat. Like most companies in the market, the manufacturing takes place in Taiwan. Final assembly is in the Netherlands.

LandFighter offers different types of vehicles in the field of ATVs and Side by Sides, the vehicles are European approved and are allowed on the road within the European Union. LandFighter makes use of branded components such as a 50 hp Subaru Fuji Heavy Industries engine and a 42.2 hp SYM engine, NGK spark plug and Maxxis tires. The vehicles are tested on surfaces covered in snow and mud.

In December 2013 the Benelux Office for Intellectual Property had to judge on a brand infringement objection by Land Rover against LandFighter, asking for an examination whether there is too much similarity between the word LAND ROVER and Logo and brand name of LandFighter, both verbal and visual elements were included. The conclusion of the BOIP is that the brands have merely the descriptive word element 'Land' in common. The Benelux Office for Intellectual Property therefore announced that the differences between the mark and the sign, as the added visual elements and the use of colors and the differences between the dominant verbal elements were sufficient to neutralize. The similarities were too small and there was no risk of confusion. The opposition was rejected.

References

External links 
  

Car manufacturers of the Netherlands
Vehicle manufacturing companies established in 2011
Dutch brands
Dutch companies established in 2011